Ollie O'Toole (1912–1992) was an American film and television actor.
Born in Pittsburgh, Pennsylvania, US. He was an actor, comedian and impressionist with Horace Heidt and later known
for his acting in "The Oregon Trail" in 1959, "Mission Impossible" in 1996 and "One of Our Spies is Missing" in 1966. He was
married to Mildred L O'Toole. He died on February 25, 1992, at the age of 79 in Los Angeles, California, US. Around
the year 1939, Horace Heidt recruited Ollie O'Toole as a comedian and impressionist. Ollie later became the announcer 
on the radio program, "Treasure Chest". Among Ollie's favorite tricks was tap dancing. He danced with his teeth. Gimmicks
aside, he was best known for his impressions of H.V. Kaltenborn, his most popular, Elmer Davis, Fred Allen, Charles Boyer,
Katharine Hepburn, Bonnie Baker, Charlie McCarthy and Edger Bergen and Charlie Chaplin. Ollie was an important partner on stage 
with Art Carney. He was a much overlooked comedian and the perfect complement to Art. The two comics, Art and Ollie, would stand
at opposite ends of the stage and take turns doing impressions, one after the other in what was billed as the "Battle of the 
Impersonators". The 15-minute skit never failed to trigger a host of guffaws and cheers from the audience. Two of his recorded
songs were "I Wanna Make with the Happy Times" in 1940 and "Three Little Sisters" in 1942.

Selected filmography
 Official Detective series - Episode: "The Jailhouse Gang" as Hudson (1958)
 The Oregon Trail (1959)
 Bat Masterson (1959)
 20,000 Eyes (1961)
 Gunsmoke (1964) as the Teleographer in “Journey For Three” (SS9E36)
 One of Our Spies Is Missing (1966)
 Lost In Space (TV series) (1965–1966) Episode: "My Friend Mr. Nobody" as Mr. Nobody (voice), "War of the Robots" as Robotoid (voice)

References

Bibliography
 Pitts, Michael R. Western Movies: A Guide to 5,105 Feature Films. McFarland, 2012.

External links

1912 births
1992 deaths
American male film actors
American male television actors
20th-century American male actors